In human anatomy, the extensor indicis [proprius] is a narrow, elongated skeletal muscle in the deep layer of the dorsal forearm, placed medial to, and parallel with, the extensor pollicis longus.  Its tendon goes to the index finger, which it extends.

Structure
It arises from the distal third of the dorsal part of the body of ulna and from the interosseous membrane. It runs through the fourth tendon compartment together with the extensor digitorum, from where it projects into the dorsal aponeurosis of the index finger.

Opposite the head of the second metacarpal bone, it joins the ulnar side of the tendon of the extensor digitorum which belongs to the index finger.

Like the extensor digiti minimi (i.e. the extensor of the little finger), the tendon of the extensor indicis runs and inserts on the ulnar side of the tendon of the common extensor digitorum. The extensor indicis lacks the juncturae tendinum interlinking the tendons of the extensor digitorum on the dorsal side of the hand.

Variation 
The extensor indicis proprius does not show much variation. It exists as a single tendon most of the time.  Double tendons of the extensor indicis proprius was also reported.

It is known that the extensor indicis proprius inserts to the index finger on the ulnar side of the extensor digitorum. However, the insertion on the radial side of the common extensor digitorum infrequently seen, namely the extensor indicis radialis. Split tendons of the muscle inserting on both ulnar and the radial side of the common extensor digitorum was also reported.

Anomalous hand extensors including the extensor medii proprius and the extensor indicis et medii communis are often seen as variations of the extensor indicis  due to the shared characteristics and embryonic origin.

Function
The extensor indicis extends the index finger, and by its continued action assists in extending (dorsiflexion) the wrist and the midcarpal joints.

Because the index finger and little finger have separate extensors, these fingers can be moved more independently than the other fingers.

Additional images

See also 
 Extensor digitorum
 Extensor medii proprius
 Extensor indicis et medii communis

Notes

References

External links
  - "Extensor Region of Forearm and Dorsum of Hand: Deep Muscles of Extensor Region"
 
 
 

Muscles of the upper limb